The 2017 season is Albirex Niigata Singapore FC's 14th consecutive season in the top flight of Singapore football and in the S.League, having joined the Sleague in 2004. Along with the S.League, the club will also compete in Singapore Cup and the Singapore League Cup.  They are the defending champions in 2017.

Squad

Coaching staff

Transfers

Pre-season transfers

In

Out

Mid-season transfers

Trial

Friendlies

Pre-season friendlies

In Season Friendlies

Match cancelled after 1st half due to lightning warning signal

Team statistics

Appearances and goals

Competitions

Overview

S.League

Singapore Cup

Quarter-final

Albirex won 7-1 on aggregate.

Semi-final

Albirex won 5-2 on aggregate.

Final
Albirex won on penalty

Singapore TNP League Cup

Group matches

Knock out Stage

References

Albirex Niigata Singapore FC seasons
Singaporean football clubs 2017 season